The 2022 Men's EuroHockey Indoor Championship was the twentieth edition of the Men's EuroHockey Indoor Championship, the biennial international men's indoor hockey championship of Europe organized by the European Hockey Federation.

It was originally planned to be held alongside the women's tournament from 12 to 16 January 2022 at the Alsterdorfer Sporthalle in Hamburg, Germany. However on 22 December 2021, the tournament was postponed to 8 to 11 December 2022 due to the COVID-19 pandemic in Europe.

Austria won their third title by defeating the hosts and defending champions Germany 2–1 in the final. The Netherlands won the bronze medal after defeating Switzerland 10–3.

Qualified teams
Participating nations have qualified based on their final ranking from the 2020 competition.

Preliminary  round

Pool

Classification round

Fifth place game

Third place game

Final

Statistics

Final standings

Goalscorers

See also
2022 Men's EuroHockey Indoor Championship II
2022 Women's EuroHockey Indoor Championship

Notes

References

Men's EuroHockey Indoor Championship
Men 1
International indoor hockey competitions hosted by Germany
EuroHockey Indoor Championship
EuroHockey Indoor Championship
Sports competitions in Hamburg
2020s in Hamburg
EuroHockey Indoor Championship